Statistics of Russian Top League in the 1994 season.

Overview
16 teams participated, and FC Spartak Moscow won the championship.

League standings

Results

Top scorers
21 goals
 Igor Simutenkov (Dynamo Moscow)

20 goals
 Oleg Garin (Lokomotiv Moscow)

12 goals
 Oleg Veretennikov (Rotor)

10 goals
 Vladimir Beschastnykh (Spartak Moscow)

9 goals
 Vladimir Filimonov (Zhemchuzhina)
 Yuri Matveyev (Uralmash)
 / Vladimir Niederhaus (Rotor)
 Andrei Tikhonov (Spartak Moscow)

8 goals
 Andrei Afanasyev (Torpedo Moscow)
 Timur Bogatyryov (Zhemchuzhina)
 Dmitri Cheryshev (Dynamo Moscow)
 Yuri Kalitvintsev (Lokomotiv Nizhny Novgorod)
 Aleksandr Smirnov (Dynamo Moscow)

Medal squads

References
Russia - List of final tables (RSSSF)

Russian Premier League seasons
1
Russia
Russia